The Devil's Cigarette Lighter was a natural gas well fire at Gassi Touil in the Sahara Desert of Algeria. The flame was seen from orbit by John Glenn during the flight of Friendship 7 on February 20, 1962.

After burning almost six months, the fire was extinguished by well fire expert Red Adair, who used explosives to deprive the flame of oxygen. The exploit made Adair a celebrity. Adair worked the fire with Asger "Boots" Hansen and Ed "Coots" Matthews, who later formed the Boots & Coots well control company. Preparations took five months while Adair's team cleared wreckage from near the wellhead with shielded bulldozers, dug wells, and excavated three reservoirs for water supplies. On April 28, 1962, Adair used a modified bulldozer with a  arm to move a metal drum containing a  nitroglycerin charge to the well. Adair, Matthews, Hansen and Charlie Tolar rode the rig, protected by a metal heat shield and water sprays, with Adair driving and the others on a shielded platform while medical teams and evacuation helicopters stood by. The explosion extinguished the fire by displacing oxygen from the area of the ruptured well. Water from the reservoirs was used to flood the area for two days to cool the well. Drilling mud was pumped into the hole to control the flow of gas and the well was capped after four days of work. Lateral wells to the GT2 well bore pumped mud into the bore to help to control the flow of gas.

Part of the 1968 John Wayne movie Hellfighters was loosely based upon the feats of Adair during the 1962 Sahara Desert fire.

References

External links
 Video of the well capping narrated by Red Adair

Industrial fires and explosions
Ouargla Province
1961 in Algeria
November 1961 events in Africa